Streptomyces neyagawaensis is an Actinomycetota species in the antibiotic producing genus Streptomyces.

S. neyagawaensis is known to produce the isoflavone orobol or the antifungal antibiotic folimycin.

Taxonomy 
In 1979 Elesawy and Szabo proposed Streptomyces neyagawaensis be assigned to the Diastatochromogenes cluster along with S. scabies, S. bottropensis, S. diastatochromogenes, S. eurythermus and S. griseosporeus, which was later confirmed by other authors based on morphological and genetic analyses.

References

External links 

Type strain of Streptomyces neyagawaensis at BacDive -  the Bacterial Diversity Metadatabase

neyagawaensis
Bacteria described in 1960